{{DISPLAYTITLE:C28H48O}}
The molecular formula C28H48O (molar mass: 400.68 g/mol, exact mass: 400.3705 u) may refer to:

 Campesterol
 Ergostenol
 α-Ergostenol
 β-Ergostenol
 Fungisterol (γ-Ergostenol)
 Lophenol